General elections were held in Bangladesh on 18 February 1979. The result was a victory for the Bangladesh Nationalist Party, which won 207 of the 300 seats. Voter turnout was 51.3%. The Awami League became the main opposition party after winning 39 seats.

With almost all parties participating, the elections were deemed credible by observers.

Results

References

General
General elections in Bangladesh
Bangladesh
Bangladesh